Giuseppe Moricci (11 March 1806 - 28 January 1879) was an Italian painter, mainly of genre, vedute, and contemporary events.

Biography
He was born in Florence. He became professor of the Academy of Fine Arts of Florence. Among his works is the Processione dell'angiolino alla SS. Annunziata di Firenze. He frequented the Caffè Michelangiolo, alonge with Enrico Pollastrini. Many of his vedute are drawings or engravings that show sections of Florence prior to Risanamiento. His Letter from the Volunteer (soldier) is displayed in the Senate building in Rome.

References

1806 births
1879 deaths
19th-century Italian painters
Italian male painters
Painters from Florence
Academic staff of the Accademia di Belle Arti di Firenze
19th-century Italian male artists